A Close Call for Boston Blackie (1946) is the tenth of fourteen Columbia Pictures crime films directed by Lew Landers starring Chester Morris as Boston Blackie.

Plot
Ignoring Inspector Farraday's (Richard Lane) friendly advice to stop helping women, Boston Blackie goes to the rescue of a female being attacked by two men. She turns out to be Geraldine "Gerry" Peyton (Lynn Merrick), an old flame of his. She begs him to help protect her baby from her husband John (an uncredited Mark Roberts), who has just been paroled.

When John finds them together, he assumes the child is Blackie's and pulls out a gun. A fight breaks out, during which an unseen third party shoots John. Acting on an anonymous tip, Farraday arrives soon after and assumes Blackie is responsible for the dead body. Blackie has his sidekick, "the Runt" (George E. Stone), hide the baby at the apartment of the latter's girlfriend, Mamie Carleton (an unbilled Claire Carleton).

Blackie escapes from dimwitted Sergeant Matthews (Frank Sully). An investigation soon arouses his suspicions. It turns out that Gerry and Smiley Slade are trying to swindle her wealthy father-in-law, Cyrus Peyton. The child is actually her brother Hack Hagen's (an unbilled Charles Lane). They framed Blackie in order to get rid of John. When Hagen tries to back out, worried that he will not get his son back, Smiley guns him down.

Disguised as Cyrus, Blackie goes to see the pair. He manages to overcome Smiley, only to have Farraday break in, arrest him, and let Gerry and Smiley go free. However, it is all a joke on Blackie. For once, Farraday has figured out who the real crooks are; when Blackie goes downstairs, he sees the pair in handcuffs.

Cast
 Chester Morris as Boston Blackie
 Lynn Merrick as Geraldine "Gerry" Peyton
 Richard Lane as Inspector Farraday
 Frank Sully as Sergeant Matthews
 George E. Stone as "The Runt"

References

External links
 
 
 
 

American crime films
American black-and-white films
Films directed by Lew Landers
Columbia Pictures films
1940s crime films
Boston Blackie films
1940s American films